Balita Pilipinas Primetime is a Philippine television news broadcasting show broadcast by GMA News TV. Anchored by Arnold Clavio, it premiered on March 5, 2011. The show concluded on February 15, 2014.

Format
The newscast was anchored by Arnold Clavio from the GMA Network Studios in Quezon City with its regional anchors from GMA stations in Luzon, Visayas and Mindanao. It features different news from the different regions in the Philippines. The news from Luzon are reported by CJ Torida of GMA Dagupan while from Visayas are by Bobby Nalzaro of GMA Cebu and from Mindanao by Tek Ocampo of GMA Davao. By July 11, 2011, its spin-off was premiered every Weekdays at 4:00pm as Balita Pilipinas Ngayon, anchored by Mark Salazar and Maki Pulido. This newscast became known as Balita Pilipinas Primetime. With its final broadcast on February 15, 2014, the weekday afternoon edition outlived the original Saturday night edition, making it the first series whose spin-off outlives the original.

Anchors
Arnold Clavio
Jorge Guerrero (GMA Ilocos)
CJ Torida (GMA Dagupan)
Elmer Caseles (GMA Bicol)
Gerthrode Charlotte Tan (GMA Iloilo)
Adrian Bobe / Gretchen Varela (GMA Bacolod)
Bobby Nalzaro (GMA Cebu)
Joe Legaspina (GMA Northern Mindanao)
Tek Ocampo (GMA Davao)
Jennifer Solis (GMA General Santos)

References

2011 Philippine television series debuts
2014 Philippine television series endings
Filipino-language television shows
GMA News TV original programming
GMA Integrated News and Public Affairs shows